Melese levequei is a moth of the family Erebidae. It was described by Vincent in 2004. It is found in Venezuela.

References

Melese
Moths described in 2004
Arctiinae of South America